Caroline Dubois may refer to:

 Caroline Dubois (boxer) (born 2001), British amateur boxer
 Caroline Dubois (poet) (born 1960), French poet